Korean National Police University (KNPU) is a national university in Asan, South Korea founded in 1979.

History
December 28, 1979: official announcement of the Korean National Police University establishment law.
October 28, 1981: groundbreaking ceremony for the Korean National Police University building. October 28 is celebrated as the anniversary of the founding.
January 22, 1983: moved to its present campus in Yongin-City, Gyeonggi-Province.
January 21, 1984: established Training Institute of Executive Officers for Criminal Investigation.
August 2, 1984: completion of campus construction.
April 9, 1985: first commencement ceremony.
October 27, 1986: established Training Institute of Executive Officers for Anti-Communism.
October 20, 1988: established Research Institute of Public Security Affairs.
March 1, 1989: admission of five female students in its ninth year.

Campus

Symbols
The logo of the academy was created on November 23, 2005, which was the 60th anniversary of the police foundation. The eagle is the Korean eagle "cham suri", symbolic of the police stretching its wings over the "mugunghwa" (nation and its citizens) while flying up towards the sky.
 A laurel tree, which represents the campus, was inserted to indicate a sanctuary of education, with the date of its foundation "1979".
 The symbolic gate was built on September 29, 2005, to celebrate the 25th anniversary of its founding, it was created in the traditional style of architecture.
 The main gate was completed on September 2, 1983. The pillars symbolize the care of the people. The octagonal shape of the pillars represent responsibility to protect all directions of our nation, the beam between the pillars represent the democratic police forces as the nation's main beam, the keyhole is the school opening the door of truth, and the two wings represent strong patriotism and honor to guard the nation against insecurity and fear.
Symbol tower: The tower was designed by professor Kookkyung Cho at Seoul National University, School of Art, and unveiled on April 8, 1985. The rising shape represents the Police University's symbol of the eagle, meaning patriotism, justice, and honor. The body in the center represents the patriotism, the two wings of justice and honor, and the formation changes with distance. The tower measures 1,984 cm to represent the year it was completed, and the central separation line aligns with the summit of the Buphwa Mountain in the background.
 The Justice Tower was created to commemorate the first graduates in 1985.
The police memorial tower was built on August 14, 2001, to honor 12 fallen police officers. The tower was designed by architect Han Chan-Jo. It is symbolically three meters in width, three meters in length, and four meters in height, and includes the names of the fallen police officers. 
The statue of the late Gyu-Sik Choi, Inspector General, was founded on January 21, 1983, on the hill near the student's Living Hall.
 School bird: magpie
 School tree: Zelkova

Academics

Freshman orientation (Cheongram Training)
Before enrolling in the school, the National Police University provides freshmen with a two-week orientation program to help them understand the organization of the university and the police. Freshmen are given insights on the police and the police university by participating in introductory programs such as the university curriculum, campus life, and lectures titled 'History of the Police and the Police University' and 'Future-oriented Ways as a Police Officer.'

Badges are attached to the uniforms of the freshmen students, which means the end of the orientation week.

Cheongram Training has been drastically changed as part of the reform of KNPU. It was composed to eliminate the remnants of the military culture and develop one's skills as a democratic citizen. The period was also reduced from two weeks to one week. These changes represent the recent direction of KNPU reform.

Curriculum - Regular Semesters

Major subjects
Four majors of police law, criminal investigation, police administration, and 30 credits need to be taken for each course. Major courses may be taken from the junior years, and deals with police law, police administration, and police science related to practice.

Major base subjects
The major base subjects is a previous phase designed for the study of majored subjects, which have academic curricula to lay a basis for law, public administration, and police science. Students attend the class from their 1st graded to 4th graded 1st semester. A total of 85 academic credits should be completed. The department of law regulates the completion of law (43 credits) and public administration (12 credits) and the department of public administration regulates 35-credit law and 20-credit public administration. The two departments regulate the completion of the police science (30 credits).

Liberal arts
The subjects for liberal arts regulates the completion of 25 academic credits by the whole students (15 mandatory and 10 optional). The subjects consist of general liberal arts subjects necessary for university graduates to learn, and foreign language classes.

Foreign language classes are classified into English and the second foreign language.

Summer/winter semesters
Summer/winter semesters are offered in spring, summer and winter semesters. In summer for four weeks before summer vacation, English, computer, swimming, shooting, driving and police station field training are offered. In winter, the same training is offered as for summer except for swimming and driving. As for the 4th grade students, the enlistment training is conducted in cooperation with the Ministry of Defence at the winter semester for male students; and during the same period, female students take executive works at the Police Office or provide social service activities.

Foreign Language Education
Foreign language education is composed of learning English and a second foreign language, and is concentrated in the summer and winter seasonal semester of 1st year, total class time of which is 90 hours in 3 weeks. Subjects covered are TOEIC, TEPS and 2nd foreign language special lectures. This supplements regular semester curriculum which focuses on comprehension and grammar.

Police Field Duty training
Practical training at police stations covers Anti-crime (I), Investigation (II), Detective (III) and Traffic (IV) areas. This training starts from the winter semester of the 2nd year, and during this training period, students acquire field experiences. The training also helps the students acquire the experience needed for the entry level administrative staff. Besides this training for which two credits are given, there are field trip programs to crime-related institutions such as the headquarters of police and courts and correctional institutes.

Practical subjects
Practical subjects are non-credit subjects and computer, swimming, driving and shooting are in this category.

Dress code

Uniforms
Winter formal uniforms
The grades of students are distinguished by shoulder straps. Students wear a formal hat and can wear black leather gloves.

Spring and fall formal uniforms
The grades of students are distinguished by shoulder straps.  There difference between spring and fall uniforms and winter uniforms is only in the thickness.

Summer formal uniforms
Summer uniforms consist of an ivory shirt and black pants. The grades of students are distinguished by shoulder straps. Students wear a formal hat. The shoulder straps of summer uniforms are different from those of winter formal uniforms and spring and fall formal uniforms. .

Ceremony suit

Students wear the ceremony suit for graduate ceremony or entrance ceremony. It consists of white pants, deep ultramarine jacket and white shoes. In case of girls, there is a white skirt and a pair of white long boots. As a general rule students should wear white gloves and a ceremony hat. The grades of students are distinguished by shoulder straps. This uniform will be abolished from 2020 as part of the KNPU reform.

Executive suit
The executive suit is the uniform worn for lectures, consisting of a long sleeved shirt, black pants and black shoes. The grades of students are distinguished by shoulder straps.

Training wear
At training time students put on winter wear. The uniform has a training cap and military shoes. In summer students roll up the shirt sleeves and remove chest blocking fabric.

Scholarship and welfare system

Perks and courses after graduation

Perks
 Appointment as an inspector after graduation
 Total exemption of school expenses and  supplement of national expenditure for uniforms and teaching materials
 Supplement of a monthly graded allowance
 Providing an opportunity of overseas training to banner students

Courses after graduation
First, the graduates carry out rotation work for two years: for six months in police station, for one year in investigation department, for a six months in a police box.

They must be in the police for six years after graduation from KNPU otherwise, they must pay for school expenses.

Promotion is by exam or inspection promotion. The exam and inspection promotion are coexistent to a superintendent promotion, but the inspection only is done from a police superintendent.

Entering a postgraduate school
Students who wish to enter a postgraduate school can be supported by a scholarship from the university.

It is a scholarship association of KNPU and  Samsung electronic company that support a scholarship to students entering a postgraduate school. The scholarship association with Samsung has supported a registration fee and an entrance fee to ten students since 2000.

After graduating from postgraduate school, students will have to go through the same procedure as the students that don't enter a postgraduate school.

Some graduates study their field of interest by entering a postgraduate school while serving in the police.

Students' studying abroad
Every year, some students among the junior class study abroad. In 1984, students  visited the police organizations of West Germany, France, Spain to compare police system between countries. From 1986 to 1991, students studied Japan's police organization, and on People's Public Security University in China. About 22 people including students and a professor attend a workshop abroad and conduct research about the police system of that country.

Academic exchanges

Exchanges with domestic universities
The Korea National Police University has promoted academic exchanges with other universities in Korea to promote research. KNPU had an academic exchange with Seoul university in 2004 that included a mutual exchange with professors and students, a mutual authorization of grade, an interchange of scientific information and materials, an association meeting. Similarly an academic exchange was made with Hankuk University in 2006.

International academic exchange

The KNPU have focused on a short training abroad for the third grade students until 2004. As a result, the students studied abroad at the police institutions of West Germany, France, Spain in 1984 and of Japan from 1986 to 1991, of America from 1992 to 1997, Chinese People's Armed Police Force Academy from 1998. Furthermore, about 20 students have studied in Japan, America, and Australia.

KNPU has signed an agreement with several universities abroad for an undergraduate exchange programme. The first Korean exchange students started studying in Turkey in 2010.

The Chung-ram Prize
KNPU annually awards: 
 a prize to a professor, 
 a prize of sincerity to staff of the university, 
 a study prize to a student.

Lodging
Students live in a dormitory from entrance into school to graduation. The state pays for the students' educational expenses. Students are given an allowance for each month. Students are given commodities needed for education like textbooks, school supplies, bedclothes, and clothing.

College men live in a dormitory that consists of four buildings, which cover 3,828 pyeong (12,655 m2) floor space, and women live in one dormitory that covers 196 pyeong(638 m2).

School life

Graduation ceremony
KNPU holds a commencement for graduates, who have finished four-year school courses successfully in February each year. This ceremony is a  festival that graduates, guests, undergraduate students, and the parents and relatives of graduates attend. The Korean President attends this event to celebrate the future of graduates every other year.

Farewell party for graduates
This event is held annually ahead of the graduation ceremony. This is an event where undergraduates celebrate the future of their graduate seniors. After giving a ring for graduates each as a memento of four-year school life, all gather at the school cafeteria to socialise.

Entrance ceremony
The ceremony is held in the grand auditorium arranged by the dean of KNPU. New students can enter KNPU after participating in the pre-school program for two weeks. Parents and seniors attend the ceremony to welcome their entrance.

Welcoming music concert for new students
Every Friday when mid-term exam in first semester finishes, a music concert is held for welcoming new students. It is arranged by the symphony orchestra of police.

Cheong-nam festival
This is a cultural ceremony. Students hold it every end of September through a festival committee. The festival is held for three days and many clubs show their activities. Performances are held like a play or a musical performance.

Cheong-nam sports festival
At the end of May, Cheong-nam sports festival is held with all members of Korea National Police University. Students, school staff, riot police in KNPU, and nearby residents take part in the festival. Students are divided into four teams and play sports like soccer, basketball, dodge ball, baseball, and marathon.

Music concert for civilian-police friendship
This is an event where the police symphony orchestra and civilians enjoy music together. This is held on annual police day in the Se-jong cultural center.

Clubs
There are about 30 clubs in KNPU.

Academics
English studying club, Eowoori. Chinese studying club, Chin-Chin. Computer studying club, Computopia. Expressing passion about Poetry, Miseok literary coterie, Crime Investigation and forensic study club, Crime Investigation Committee.

Art
Playing classic guitar, Jongihak, Jazz club, Rock band, Pooreumoi, 'Samul-nori' (a folk music accompanied by four percussion instruments). Hanmadang. Drawing, painting, drawing, and sketch. Michoosamo, Photographing and developing pictures, Bityeoul. Performing plays, Ddoari, Dancing club, Freemania.

Sports
 Martial arts : Moopoong swordship, Moopoong judo, Moopoong taegwondo, Moopoong aikido, boxing club, Haedongcheong
 Normal sports : Soccer club, Basketball club, Baseball club
 Other sports : Golf club, swimming, scuba diving club, Badaragi, mountain climbing club, horse riding club, tennis club.

Social service and cultivation
 Dahyang: students belong to this club have tea and learn tea ceremony, and cultivate mind and enhance friendly relationship.
 Manpaeboolcheong: Baduk club.
 Dooreson: Sign language club to be bridge between hearing-impaired people and police.
 Sarang Gopbaegi: organized social service club.

Religion
Christian student council, Buddhism student council, Catholic student council.

Media
 University's newspaper
 BCBS: broadcasting in dormitories and making short movies to show at festivals
 Editing Committee for the university's Gazette: edit the university's Gazette including student's opinion, news about KNPU, papers, and essay.

Education course for police manager

Course for police commanders

The Police command course consists of the Guardian Program, which is a six-month program to train police leaders through duties, professional interpersonal skill, general education, foreign language, IT education, study abroad, country pilgrimage, and scene experience-study.

Course object
 To raise the ability to develop public security policies
 To integrate the capacity and the ability of managing duties as field commanders and officers

Course outline
 Training period: 22 weeks or 770 hours (twice a year)
 Trainee: One time train, approximately 30 senior superintendents (including post-promotion) - basic training at senior superintendent level
 Alumni: In the first half of 2000, the first class started.

Course objectives
 To cultivate the adjusting ability to changes of public security environment
 To educate the ability to manage practically as police managing staff
 To enhance education in IT and globalization

See also
List of national universities in South Korea
List of universities and colleges in South Korea
Education in Korea

External links
 Korea National Police University website
 National Police Agency
 National Police Digital Library
 The journal of Police Science
 Korea National Police Orchestra
 Korea National Police University Alumni Association
 National Police Hospital
 National Institute Of Scientific Investigation
 Korea Police Investigation Academy

Asan
Universities and colleges in South Chungcheong Province
National universities and colleges in South Korea
Law enforcement in South Korea
Educational institutions established in 1979
1979 establishments in South Korea
Police academies